The University of Navarra is a private research university located on the southeast border of Pamplona, Spain.  It was founded in 1952 by St. Josemaría Escrivá de Balaguer, the founder of Opus Dei, as a corporate work of the apostolate of Opus Dei. The University of Navarra has consistently been ranked as the best private university in Spain. In 2021, the university's School of Law was ranked best in Spain and 44th in the world by Times Higher Education's international rankings.

Through its six campuses (Pamplona, San Sebastián, Madrid, Barcelona, Munich and New York City), the university confers 35 official degrees, 13 dual degrees and more than 38 master's programs in 14 faculties, 2 university schools, 17 institutes, its graduate business school, IESE ("Instituto de Estudios Superiores de la Empresa"; in English: "International Graduate School of Management" or "Institute of Higher Business Studies"), ISSA ("Instituto Superior de Secretariado y Administracion"; in English: Superior Institute of Secretarial and Administrative Studies), and other centers and institutions.

The university also runs a teaching hospital, CUN, where 2,045 qualified professionals handle more than 100,000 patients each year, and a medical center research, CIMA, that focuses on four main areas: Oncology, Neuroscience, Cardiovascular Sciences, and Gene Therapy and Hepatology.

History

The institution was founded as the Estudio General de Navarra on 17 October 1952 with the encouragement of Josemaría Escrivá. It began as a School of Law with 48 students and eight professors, under the direction of Ismael Sánchez Bella. The founder described the ideals he wanted to transmit in the university:

After the foundation of the Faculty of Philosophy in 1955 and the Business School, IESE, in 1958, the Estudio General de Navarra was established as a university by The Holy See on 6 August 1960, and Escrivá was designated as the Great Chancellor. The university received an official accreditation from the Spanish State, on 8, September 1962.

Students
The university has a total of 11,180 students (1,758 international); 8,636 whom are pursuing a bachelor's degree, 1,581 of whom are master's degree students, and 963 PhD students.

In addition, it has agreements with other universities, including the University of Washington (USA), the University of Hong Kong (Hong Kong) and the University of Edinburgh (UK).

Campus

Most of the facilities and centers are located in Pamplona, with the exception of IESE Business School, which is based in Barcelona, Madrid, Munich and New York; the School of Engineering, Tecnun, based in Donostia-San Sebastián and the ISEM Fashion Business School which is located in Madrid.

In January 2015, the Museum of the University of Navarra was inaugurated by King Felipe VI and houses a collection donated to the university by María Josefa Huarte Beaumont. This collection, regarded as one of the greatest collections of contemporary art in Spain, includes works by Pablo Picasso and Wassily Kandinsky, among other artists. The architect in charge of the project was Rafael Moneo.

The museum also aims to increase interaction between the faculties, centers, departments and schools of the university, and to be a point of reference in the world of contemporary art.

Research
The university faculties and schools have thousands of researchers in different areas. The 8 centers and 17 institutes, located in the five campuses, carry out their research in the fields of Science and the Humanities, as well as the University Clinic of Navarra, the Center for Applied Medical Research and the Institute of Society and Culture.

Notable alumni 
 Alessandra de Osma, wife of Prince Christian of Hanover
 Arancha González, current Spanish Minister of Foreign Affairs
 Pedro Morenés, previous ambassador of Spain to the United States
 Álex Pina, Spanish director and producer 
María Elósegui, Spanish judge at the European Court of Human Rights
Pedro Sánchez, current Prime Minister of Spain
Daniel Hadad, Argentine businessman
Marek Kamiński, Polish polar explorer

References

External links
Official English language website
Ranking of Spain's Universities (2016)
Ranking of Spain's Master Programs (2016)
Economist Intelligence Unit's 2016 MBA rankings
The University of Navarra site at www.josemariaescriva.info
Article of Msgr. Javier Echevarría on the University of Navarra, published in Revista Antiguos Alumnos del IESE, Barcelona, (December 2007)

 
Educational institutions established in 1952
Opus Dei universities and colleges
Buildings and structures in Pamplona
1952 establishments in Spain